is a Japanese cyclist, who was selected to represent Japan in the 2015 UCI Road World Championships.

Major results

2008
 2nd Road race, National Under-23 Road Championships
2010
 7th Overall Tour of Thailand
1st Stage 5
 7th Overall Tour de Hokkaido
2011
 7th Overall Tour de Okinawa
2014
 Tour de Singkarak
1st Stages 1 & 6
 3rd Overall Tour de Hokkaido
 7th Tour de Okinawa
 8th Overall Tour of Thailand
 9th Overall Tour de Taiwan
2015
 1st Prologue (TTT) Tour de Guadeloupe
 2nd Overall Tour of Thailand
1st Stage 1
 3rd  Road race, Asian Road Championships
 7th Overall Tour de Hokkaido
2016
 3rd Tour de Okinawa
 8th Overall Tour de Kumano
2019
 2nd Overall Tour de Iskandar Johor
 2nd Tour de Okinawa

References

External links

1988 births
Living people
Japanese male cyclists
Cyclists at the 2016 Summer Olympics
Olympic cyclists of Japan